Laurelwood Pub and Brewery is a restaurant and public brewery chain located in the state of Oregon. They have a total of five locations, as of 2014, around the Portland metropolitan area. It was founded by Mike De Kalb and his wife Cathy Woo-De Kalb. The brewery has run pubs in Portland International Airport.

References

External links
 Official website

Beer in Oregon
Beer brewing companies based in Oregon
Restaurants in Portland, Oregon